The EMD SW8 is a diesel switcher locomotive manufactured by General Motors Electro-Motive Division and General Motors Diesel between September 1950 and February 1954. A total of 
309 of this model were built for United States railroads and 65 for Canadian railroads. Starting in October 1953 a number of SW8s were built with either the 567BC or 567C engine.

US Army SW8s
 
The United States Army ordered 41 SW8s, numbered 2000–2040, for service in Korea during the Korean War. These were shipped in the spring of 1951.

After the Korean War, many US Army-owned SW8s were turned over to the South Korean government while others were retained by the Army and assigned to various Army posts, depots and ammunition plants. Most were retired around 1990 and replaced in service by rebuilt geeps, such as GP10s from VMV in Paducah, KY, and other rebuilders.

Of all of the locomotives turned over to the Korean National Railroad, only one, KNR #2001, believed to be ex-USAX #2011, still exists. As of May 2011 it was stored in the back of a locomotive shed in the Korea Railroad Busan Rolling Stock Workshop, 125 Sincheon-ro, Busanjin-gu, Busan, Korea 614-765. Diesel Locomotive Team Leader Kim Hyun-Sik stated KORAIL is in talks with the city of Pusan to put the locomotive on display in the city as a part of Korea's heritage, as it is the oldest diesel locomotive in the country.

Two examples of these locomotives, ex-USAX #2019 and #2022, are preserved at the Heart of Dixie Railroad Museum in Alabama. After serving in Korea, #2019 was sent back to the manufacturer for reconditioning in 1953. #2022 was rebuilt in 1955. Both served in military bases in the United States until the early 1990s, finishing their careers at Fort Campbell, Ky. The Heart of Dixie Railroad Museum acquired them in 1995.

Other models
In addition, 12 TR6 cow-calf paired sets were produced.

In May 1953, a single example of the SW8 was built with a hydraulic transmission as model DH2. This locomotive was displayed at a trade show in 1955, but no sales of the DH2 followed. The locomotive was rebuilt with a standard electrical transmission, and served EMD as plant switcher #105 until 1968.

The first TR6A, Southern Pacific 4600, later numbered 1100, is preserved at the Western Pacific Railroad Museum at Portola, California.

Original buyers

SW8

Locomotives built by Electro-Motive Division, USA

Locomotives built by General Motors Diesel, Canada

TR6

See also 
List of GM-EMD locomotives
List of GMD Locomotives

References

 
 EMD Product Reference Data Card dated January 1, 1959 has the 567BC and 567C engine data used in the as-built roster.

SW0008
SW0008
B-B locomotives
Railway locomotives introduced in 1950
Diesel-electric locomotives of the United States
Locomotives with cabless variants
Standard gauge locomotives of the United States
Standard gauge locomotives of Canada
Standard gauge locomotives of South Korea
Diesel-electric locomotives of Canada
Diesel-electric locomotives of South Korea
Shunting locomotives